Tirza Parish is an administrative unit of Gulbene Municipality in the Vidzeme region of Latvia.

Towns, villages and settlements of Tirza parish

References 

Parishes of Latvia
Gulbene Municipality
Vidzeme